Braddish may refer to:

 Daniel Braddish, applicant in the Irish Supreme Court case Braddish v DPP
 John Braddish, a rugby league player - see List of Oldham R.L.F.C. players 
 Kim Braddish, morning newsperson on 2Day FM, a radio station broadcasting to Sydney, New South Wales, Australia
 Phil Braddish, English rugby league player - see 2013 North Wales Crusaders season
 Synan Braddish (born 1958), Irish former footballer
 Braddish Billings (1783–1864), early settler in the Ottawa region of Canada